The Plateau Phase is the debut studio album by English post-punk band Crispy Ambulance, released in March 1982 by Factory Benelux. It was a departure to the sound of the earlier singles which was considered to be closer to the sound of post-punk contemporaries Joy Division. It peaked at No. 21 on the UK Indie Charts by the months of May and April 1982.

Critical reception

It received harsh criticism at the time, a typical example being this review by Mat Snow for NME:

Retrospective criticism was more positive, e.g. Ned Raggett, AllMusic:

Original Track Listing
Side one
 "Are You Ready?" – 5:49
 "Travel Time" – 3:51
 "The Force and the Wisdom" – 4:02
 "The Wind Season" – 5:29
 "Death from Above" – 3:28
Side two
"We Move Through the Plateau Phase" – 5:50
 "Bardo Plane" – 3:32
 "Chill" – 4:47
 "Federation" –3:44
 "Simon's Ghost" –3:42

CD reissue
The CD, first issued as Comprising : The Plateau Phase, Live On A Hot August Night, Sexus, includes the Live on a Hot August Night single and the "Sexus" A-Side. It was issued on Factory Benelux in 1990 (FBN-12-CD) and LTM in 1999 (LTMCD-2315). The sleeve design is based on the sleeve of Live on a Hot August Night.

It was reissued again on Factory Benelux in 2012 (FBN-12-CD) with the original sleeve and title.

 "Are You Ready?" – 5:49
 "Travel Time" – 3:51
 "The Force and the Wisdom" – 4:02
 "The Wind Season" – 5:29
 "Death from Above" – 3:28
 "We Move Through the Plateau Phase" – 5:50
 "Bardo Plane" – 3:32
 "Chill" – 4:47
 "Federation" – 3:44
 "Simon's Ghost" – 3:42
 "The Presence" – 13:03
 "Concorde Square" – 9:08
 "Sexus" – 6:11

References

External links

1982 debut albums
Crispy Ambulance albums
Factory Records albums
Albums produced by Martin Hannett